Aleksinac is a town and municipality located in the Nišava District of southern Serbia. According to 2011 census, the town has a population of 17,978 inhabitants, while the municipality has 51,863 inhabitants.

History

Prehistory and Antiquity
The territory of the municipality of Aleksinac has been inhabited since the neolithic age. Most of the settlements in the area belong to the Vinča cultural group, and are located on the western side of the South Morava river.

After the fall to the Romans this territory was included in the province Upper Moesia and after 293 AD it was in the Mediterranean province Dacia. A Roman military road (Via Militaris) was built in 1st century AD across the territory. There were also two stations for rest (mansio) and change of horses (mutatio) along the road on the territory of Aleksinac: Praesidium Pompei and Rappiana.

Their location is still unknown, although there are few candidates for this position. Also few fortresses (Castell) are known to existed in this period, but their names are not known, except for the Castell Milareca on Gradiste hill (228 m).

Middle Ages
From the year 476 this territory was under Byzantine rule. There are evidences of settlements from this time, however their names still remain unknown.

During the reigns of emperors Phocas (602-610) and Heraclius (610-641) Slavic peoples inhabit Balkan peninsula. In 614 they razed Niš. The Via Militaris was renamed Medieval Military Road and it was used by the crusaders of first four Crusades to reach Constantinople thus passing through the territory of Aleksinac municipality.

During the reign of the Nemanjić dynasty this territory was under direct control of the state. After the death of Uroš V this territory was included in the territory of Moravian Serbia under the Prince Lazar and his successors. Two medieval towns, Bolvan and Lipovac, date from this period.

Ottoman rule

Aleksinac is first mentioned in 1516 in "Kruševački Tefter", a list of towns and its residents were made by Turks to keep an eye on taxes, as the village belonging to Bolvan province and Kruševac sanjak. It remained village up to the end of the 16th century when it was developed into town settlement.

In the middle of the 17th century, Aleksinac was town with more than 100 shops in it, and because of its strategic location on the road to Istanbul it became important travel and caravan station. Its importance can be supported by the fact that Turks built fortress to protect it from outlaws in 1616.

The development of Aleksinac was stopped during the so-called Great Turkish War (1683–1699). Aleksinac was conquered by Austrian army (general Ludwig of Baden liberated it), and later burned to the ground by the soldiers of Jegen-Osman Pasha. Serbian inhabitants of Aleksinac joined Great Serb Migrations to Habsburg monarchy and some of them settled down in Budim.
Aleksinac was destroyed again by fire during the second Austro-Turkish war (1716–1718) when grand vizier Hallil Pasha was defeated beneath the walls of Belgrade. In retreat he burned down all settlements all the way to Niš.

After the third Austro-Turkish War (1737–1739) Aleksinac developed into significant trade and handcraft center. Many caravans passed through it exchanging wares from entire Ottoman Empire and central Europe. At the same time it became center of Aleksinac county which in 1784 consisted of 17 villages. There were 160 houses in Aleksinac at that time, 120 of them Christian and 40 Turkish.

After the fourth Austro-Turkish War (1787–1791) Aleksinac was burned down again by the Turkish outlaws led by Osman Pazvantoğlu.

Modern times

Aleksinac and its surrounding area joined the First Serbian Uprising in January 1806. This included villages on the right bank of the South Morava river which were liberated by the army of Petar Dobrnjac.

The settlements on the left bank were liberated by Mladen Milovanović and Stanoje Glavaš. As soon as the town was liberated, Captain Vuča Žikić built the famous Deligrad trenches on the north side of Aleksinac which earned fame in battles with the Turks, especially in 1806.

After the fall on the First Serbian Uprising, Aleksinac remained under Turkish rule up to December 1832 when it became integral part of Prince Miloš's Serbia. During his first reign Aleksinac became the economic centre of the south-east Serbia with numerous trade and handicrafts shops and it developed into important government centre.

It became a centre of county and county court. The third post office in Serbia (after Belgrade and Kragujevac) was opened in Aleksinac for both Serbian and Austrian post as well as the place where English courier sent and received the post from Turkey. At that time Customs office and quarantine station were built in Aleksinac.

Aleksinac was also the site of major battles with Turks in First Serbo-Turkish war in 1876, with only true victory won on Šumatovac, 3 kilometers from Aleksinac. From 1929 to 1941,  Aleksinac was part of the Morava Banovina of the Kingdom of Yugoslavia.

Vojska aleksinca je osnovana od strane Milana Stoiljkovica za vreme NATO bombardovanja 1999. godine sa misijom da odu u SAD i da izvrse atentat na Klintona jer je on broj 1 po suntavilu

Aleksinac was seriously damaged during the NATO bombing of Yugoslavia in 1999.

Settlements
Aside from the town of Aleksinac, the municipality includes the following settlements:

 Aleksinački Bujmir
 Aleksinački Rudnik
 Bankovac
 Beli Breg
 Belja
 Bobovište
 Bovan
 Bradarac
 Vakup
 Veliki Drenovac
 Vitkovac
 Vrelo
 Vrćenovica
 Vukanja
 Vukašinovac
 Glogovica
 Golešnica
 Gornja Peščanica
 Gornje Suhotno
 Gornji Adrovac
 Gornji Krupac
 Gornji Ljubeš
 Gredetin
 Grejač
 Dašnica
 Deligrad
 Dobrujevac
 Donja Peščanica
 Donje Suhotno
 Donji Adrovac
 Donji Krupac
 Donji Ljubeš
 Draževac
 Žitkovac
 Jakovlje
 Jasenje
 Kamenica
 Katun
 Koprivnica
 Korman
 Kraljevo
 Krušje
 Kulina
 Lipovac
 Loznac
 Loćika
 Lužane
 Ljupten
 Mali Drenovac
 Mozgovo
 Moravac
 Moravski Bujmir
 Nozrina
 Porodin
 Prekonozi
 Prćilovica
 Prugovac
 Radevce
 Rsovac
 Rutevac
 Srezovac
 Stanci
 Stublina
 Subotinac
 Tešica
 Trnjane
 Ćićina
 Crna Bara
 Česta
 Čukurovac
 Šurić

Demographics

According to the last official census done in 2011, the municipality of Aleksinac has 51,863 inhabitants.

Ethnic groups
The ethnic composition of the municipality:

Economy
The following table gives a preview of total number of registered people employed in legal entities per their core activity (as of 2018):

Tourism 
Lake Bovan, situated 15 km from Aleksinac centre, is a place popular for tourists. The medieval monastery from the 15th century built by Despot Stefan Lazarević, St. Stefan in Lipovac, is 25 km from the city. The monastery is built beneath the slopes of Mt. Ozren (1175 m). There is also remnants of two medieval towns in the mountains surrounding Aleksinac: Bovan and Lipovac, however they are not well preserved.

Notable locals 
 Kosta Taušanović (1854–1902), one of the founders of Serbian Radical Party, minister of police and minister of commerce, founder of first insurance company in Serbia.
 Stevan Dimitrijević (1866–1953), theologian, historian and rector of Theologian University in Belgrade.
 Mihailo Gavrilović (1868–1924) prominent Serbian historian and diplomat.
 Dragutin Jovanović-Lune (1892–1932), Serbian guerrilla fighter, officer, politician, delegate and mayor of Vrnjci. He was awarded several times for his service in the Balkan Wars and World War I.
 Dejan Stojanovic Serbian musician, prominent guitar player.

Trivia
 The patron saint of Aleksinac is St. Mark.
 Aleksinac was the first Serbian town to get a post office, on May 25, 1840. The second was opened in Belgrade and the third in Kragujevac.
 Aleksinac is the home of the Native Indians Society of Serbia.

Twin towns – sister cities

Aleksinac is twinned with:
 Aiani, Greece
 Hisarya, Bulgaria
 Laurium, Greece
 Probištip, North Macedonia
 Zagorje ob Savi, Slovenia

References and further reading 

 Istorija Aleksinca i okoline do kraja prve vladavine kneza Miloša, Sprić Miodrag, Aleksinac, 1995.
 Aleksinac i okolina, Dr. Branko Peruničić, Beograd, 1978.

External links 

 

Populated places in Nišava District
Municipalities and cities of Southern and Eastern Serbia